Devil is a studio album released by South Korean boy band Super Junior, released on July 16, 2015, by S.M. Entertainment. Released as a "special album", the album features nine members, marking the return of Yesung after his mandatory military service. This also marks the first album without Shindong and Sungmin, due to mandatory military service. Devil is the final release to feature Kangin before his hiatus and eventual departure from Super Junior in 2019.

Background
After announcing that Super Junior returned with special album Devil on July 16 to celebrate the group's 10th anniversary, S.M. Entertainment released a comical trailer, heightening fans' anticipation for the comeback. The agency said, 'Friendship and trust among members along with gratitude toward fans' love are the foundation for the album.'

Production and composition
Producing team the Stereotypes worked with SM's resident composer Kenzie on title song "Devil" for a trendy melody, effectively marking the departure of the group from its usual title track production with another resident SM songwriter-producer Yoo Youngjin, the one who writes for the group's title tracks since debut. The lyrics liken a man madly in love to the disposition of the devil. The performance for "Devil" was created by choreographer Tony Testa and SM's performance director BeatBurger. The Super Junior members also offered their own insights, leading to the creation of a fun, well-woven choreography with simple motions that showcase the group's laidback charms.

The album has a total of 10 tracks including the title song "Devil". The album involves many other singers for collaboration songs such as Lee Seung Hwan, and Kim Yoon Ah, Epitone Project and Kang Jun-Woo. Member Lee Donghae participated in writing lyrics and composing for the album. The tracks are partly classified by the group's subunits, which include Super Junior-K.R.Y., Super Junior-T, Super Junior-M and Super Junior-D&E.

Promotion

Release
Super Junior held its press conference to commemorate its special album Devil release at SMTOWN COEX Artium in Samsung-dong, Seoul on July 15, 2015.

Live performances
The group made their comeback performance on the Korean music show M! Countdown with the songs "Devil" and "Don't Wake Me Up" on July 16, 2015, and kept promotions going on Music Bank, Music Core and Inkigayo. Super Junior first showcased its song during its encore concert Super Show 6 in Seoul, over two days from July 11 to 12. Super Junior performed 4 songs from the album, including the title song "Devil", "We Can", "Don't Wake Me Up" and "Alright".

Awards and nominations

Track listing

Personnel 
Credit for Devil are adapted from the album.

 S.M Entertainment Co., Ltd – Executive Producer
 Soo-man Lee – Producer
 Nam Soo-young – Director of Management
 Jung Chang-hwan – Director of Media Planning
 Lee Song-soo, Kwon Yoon-jung, Yoon Ji-hae, I Ga-won – A&R Direction & Coordinator
 Cho Min-kyung, Lee Seo-kyung – International Repertoire 
 Jung Hyo-won, Kim Min-kyung, Oh Jung-eun, Park Mi-ji – Publishing & Copyright Clearance
 Vocal director, background vocals – Yoo Young-jin
 Super Junior: Leeteuk, Heechul, Yesung, Kangin, Eunhyuk, Donghae, Siwon, Ryeowook and Kyuhyun – Vocals, background vocals
 Goo Joung-pil (BEAT BURGER) – Recording, mixing (done at S.M. Yellow Tall Studio)
 Kim Chol-Sun – Recording, mixing (done at S.M. Blue Ocean Studio)
 Jang Eui-seok – Recording, mixing (done at S.M. Blue Cup Studio)
 Kim Hyun-goon, Lee Ji-Hyoong, Kim Kyu-yeoung – Recording (done at doobdoob Studio)
 Jang EunGyung – Recording (done at Grid Studio) 
 Jag Ki-hoong – Recording (done at Seoul Studio)
 Kim Han-goo – Mixing at Sound Pool Studio
 Tom Coyne - Mastering (mastering done at Sonic Korea)

 Tak Yeong-jun, Kang Byeong-jun, Park Yeong-sin, Kim, Jung-hoon, Wan Yoong-sun, Song In-hoo, Lee Kyu-won, Park Yoong-suk, Lee Hoo-taek, KCho Bum-sun – Artist Management and Promotion
 Lee Seong-Soo, Yoon Hee-jun, Cho Yoo Eun – Artist Planning & Development
 Kim Eun-ah, Jung Sang-hee, Lee Ji-sun, Kwon Jung-ha, Lee Ji-hun – Public Relations & Publicity
 Kim Min Suk, Park Min-Kwon, Jung Kyung-sik – Media Planning
 Tak Young-jun, Hwang Sung-young, Beat Burger (Joe Sim, Greg Hwang) – Choreography Direction
 Toni Testa, Beat Burger (Greg Hwang), Mihawk Back, Hyuno Jin (Look) – Choreographer 
 Choi Jung-min – International Marketing
 Steven Myungkyung Lee – English lyrics Supervisor 
 Lee Jung-ah – Customer Relationship Management
 Park Jun-young, Sun Young, Jun Sung-jin – Music Video Direction
 Hoong Won-ki – Music Video Director
 Min Hee-jin – Visual & Art Director
 Mok Jung-ook – Photographer
 Kim Yae-min (Assistant, Lee Hye-ri) – Design
 Lee Won-hae – Stylist
 Kim Jung-eun, Kim Hye-yun – Hair Stylist
 Choi Hye-rin, Han Hyoo-eun – Make-up Artist
 Young-min Kim – Executive Supervisor

Credit for Magic are adapted from the album.

 S.M Entertainment Co., Ltd – Executive Producer
 Soo-man Lee – Producer
 Nam Soo-young – Director of Management
 Jung Chang-hwan – Director of Media Planning
 Lee Song-soo, Kwon Yoon-jung, Yoon Ji-hae, I Ga-won – A&R Direction & Coordinator
 Cho Min-kyung, Lee Seo-kyung – International Repertoire 
 Jung Hyo-won, Kim Min-kyung, Oh Jung-eun, Park Mi-ji – Publishing & Copyright Clearance
 Vocal director, background vocals – Yoo Young-jin
 Super Junior: Leeteuk, Heechul, Yesung, Kangin, Eunhyuk, Donghae, Siwon, Ryeowook and Kyuhyun – Vocals, background vocals
 Goo Joung-pil (BEAT BURGER) – Recording, mixing (done at S.M. Yellow Tall Studio)
 Kim Chol-Sun – Recording, mixing (done at S.M. Blue Ocean Studio)
 Jang Eui-seok – Recording, mixing (done at S.M. Blue Cup Studio)
 Kim Hyun-goon, Lee Ji-Hyoong, Kim Kyu-yeoung – Recording (done at doobdoob Studio)
 Jang EunGyung – Recording (done at Grid Studio) 
 Jag Ki-hoong – Recording (done at Seoul Studio)
 Kim Han-goo – Mixing at Sound Pool Studio
 Tom Coyne – Mastering (mastering done at Sonic Korea)

 Tak Yeong-jun, Kang Byeong-jun, Wan Young-sun, Kim Min-gun, Kim Si-young, Song In-ho, Park Yeong-suk – Artist Management and Promotion
 Lee Seong-Soo, Yoon Hee-jun, Cho Yoo Eun – Artist Planning & Development
 Kim Eun-ah, Jung Sang-hee, Lee Ji-sun, Kwon Jung-ha, Lee Ji-hun – Public Relations & Publicity
 Kim Min Suk, Park Min-Kwon, Jung Kyung-sik – Media Planning
 Tak Young-jun, Hwang Sung-young, Beat Burger (Joe Sim, Greg Hwang) – Choreography Direction
 Toni Testa, Beat Burger (Greg Hwang), Mihawk Back, Hyuno Jin (Look) – Choreographer 
 Choi Jung-min – International Marketing
 Steven Myungkyung Lee – English lyrics Supervisor 
 Lee Jung-ah – Customer Relationship Management
 Park Jun-young, Sun Young, Jun Sung-jin – Music Video Direction
 Hoong Won-ki – Music Video Director
 Min Hee-jin – Visual & Art Director
 JAworkshop – Design
 Kwon Hte-mi – Stylist
 Kim Jung-eun, Kim Hye-yun – Hair Stylist
 Choi Hye-rin, Han Hyoo-eun – Make-up Artist
 Lee Young-hak – Photographer
 Young-min Kim – Executive Supervisor

Chart

Weekly charts

Monthly albums

Year-end charts

Album sales

Release history

See also
 Devil
 
 
 
 
 
 Magic

References

External links
 Super Junior official homepage  
 Super Junior official YouTube channel

2015 albums
Super Junior albums
SM Entertainment albums
SM Entertainment compilation albums
Korean-language albums